Hixtape, Vol. 1 is a mixtape by American country music singer Hardy. It was released on September 13, 2019, via Big Loud Records.

Content
Hixtape, Vol. 1 is a collaborative album, in which Hardy performs with seventeen other country music singers. According to the singer himself, he kept adding more musicians to the project after more of them had agreed to his offers. Among the artists featured are Morgan Wallen, Trace Adkins, and Keith Urban. Hardy originally conceived the project as an extended play, but chose to increase it to a full album after his success in writing Blake Shelton's "God's Country" led to more artists noticing him.

Critical reception
Matt Bjorke of Roughstock reviewed the album favorably, stating that " It may never have a radio hit but there is quality here and a lot of talented folks having a damn good time which is what music should be about...and that makes this a winning project for the rising star and superstar songwriter."

Track listing

Charts

Weekly charts

Year-end charts

References

2019 mixtape albums
Big Loud albums
Hardy (singer) albums
Albums produced by Joey Moi
Collaborative albums